Yann Martel,  (born 25 June 1963) is a Canadian author who wrote the Man Booker Prize–winning novel Life of Pi, an international bestseller published in more than 50 territories. It has sold more than 12 million copies worldwide and spent more than a year on the bestseller lists of the New York Times and The Globe and Mail, among many other best-selling lists. Life of Pi was adapted for a movie directed by Ang Lee, garnering four Oscars including Best Director and winning the Golden Globe Award for Best Original Score.

Martel is also the author of the novels The High Mountains of Portugal, Beatrice and Virgil, and Self, the collection of stories The Facts Behind the Helsinki Roccamatios, and a collection of letters to Canada's Prime Minister 101 Letters to a Prime Minister. He has won a number of literary prizes, including the 2001 Hugh MacLennan Prize for Fiction and the 2002 Asian/Pacific American Award for Literature.

Martel lives in Saskatoon, Saskatchewan, with writer Alice Kuipers and their four children. His first language is French, but he writes in English.

Early life 
Martel was born in Salamanca, Spain, in 1963 to French-Canadians Émile Martel and Nicole Perron who were studying at the University of Salamanca. His mother was enrolled in Hispanic studies while his father was working on a PhD on Spanish writer Miguel de Unamuno.<ref>[https://books.google.com/books?id=kucUAQAAIAAJ&q=Nicole+Perron+Martel Google Books, Twenty-first-century Canadian writers]</ref> The family moved to Coimbra, Portugal, soon after his birth, then to Madrid, Spain, then to Fairbanks, Alaska, and finally to Victoria, British Columbia; his father taught at the Universities of Alaska and Victoria. His parents joined the Canadian foreign service, and he was raised in San José, Costa Rica, Paris, France, and Madrid, Spain, with stints in Ottawa, Ontario, in between postings.L'ÎLE, l'Infocentre littéraire des écrivains. L'ÎLE, l'Infocentre littéraire des écrivains. Retrieved 23 March 2016. Martel completed his final two years of high school at Trinity College School in Port Hope, Ontario,Notable Alumni. TCS Ontario. Retrieved 14 January 2015. and he completed an undergraduate degree in philosophy at Trent University in Peterborough, Ontario.

Martel worked at odd jobs as an adult, including as a parking lot attendant in Ottawa, a dishwasher in a tree-planting camp in northern Ontario, and a security guard at the Canadian embassy in Paris. He also travelled through Mexico, South America, Iran, Turkey, and India.Nashville Public Library: Yann Martel. Retrieved 23 March 2016. He started writing while he was at university, writing plays and short stories that were "blighted by immaturity and dreadful", as he describes them.Trent Luminary – Yann Martel. Trent University Youtube Channel. Retrieved 23 March 2016.

Martel moved to Saskatoon, Saskatchewan, with Kuipers in 2003.2013 Montanan State University, Freshman Convocation and Summer Reading 2013. Montanan State University. Retrieved 25 March 2016.

 Career 
Martel's work first appeared in print in 1988 in The Malahat Review with his short story Mister Ali and the Barrelmaker. The Malahat Review also published in 1990 his short story The Facts Behind the Helsinki Roccamatios, for which he won the 1991 Journey Prize and which was included in the 1991–1992 Pushcart Prize Anthology. In 1992, the Malahat brought out his short story The Time I Heard the Private Donald J. Rankin String Concerto with One Discordant Violin, by the American Composer John Morton, for which he won a National Magazine Award gold. The cultural magazine Border Crossings published his short story Industrial Grandeur in 1993. That same year, a bookstore in Ottawa that hosted Martel for a reading issued a handcrafted, limited edition of some of his stories, Seven Stories.

Martel credits The Canada Council for the Arts for playing a key role in fostering his career, awarding him writing grants in 1991 and 1997. In the author's note of his novel Life of Pi, he thanked them and wrote: "… If we, citizens, do not support our artists, then we sacrifice our imagination on the altar of crude reality and we end up believing in nothing and having worthless dreams."OK Novels: Excerpt, Life of Pi. OK Novels. Retrieved 23 March 2016.

In 1993, Knopf Canada published a collection of four of Martel's short stories: The Facts Behind the Helsinki Roccamatios, the eponymous story, as well as The Time I Heard the Private Donald J. Rankin String Concerto..., Manners of Dying, and The Vita Aeterna Mirror Company. On first publication, the collection appeared in Canada, the UK, France, Netherlands, Italy, and Germany.

Martel's first novel, Self, appeared in 1996. It was published in Canada, the UK, the Netherlands, and Germany.

Martel's second novel Life of Pi, was published on 11 September 2001, and was awarded the Man Booker Prize in 2002, among other awards, and became a bestseller, spending 61 weeks on The New York Times Bestseller List. Martel had been in New York the previous day, leaving on the evening of the 10th for Toronto to make the publication of his novel the next morning.Rule, Matt (22 August 2013).Bozeman Daily Chronicle, Montana State University Survival Guide. Bozeman Daily Chronicle, Montana State University. Retrieved 25 January 2015. He was inspired in part to write a story about sharing a lifeboat with a wild animal after reading a review of the novella Max and the Cats by Brazilian author Moacyr Scliar in The New York Times Book Review. Martel received some criticism from Brazilian press for failing to consult with Scliar. Martel pointed out that he could not have stolen from a work he had not yet read, and he willingly acknowledged being influenced by the New York Times review of Scliar's work and thanked him in the author's note of Life of Pi.Simas, Shed (12 July 2014). On Life of Pi, Plagiarism and the Media. Shed Simas. Retrieved 24 March 2016.  Life of Pi was later chosen for the 2003 edition of CBC Radio's Canada Reads competition, where it was championed by author Nancy Lee.  Its French translation, Histoire de Pi, was included in the debut French version of the competition Le combat des livres in 2004, championed by singer Louise Forestier.

Martel was the Samuel Fischer Visiting Professor at the Institute of Comparative Literature, Free University of Berlin in 2002, where he taught a course titled "The Animal in Literature". He then spent a year in Saskatoon, Saskatchewan, from September 2003 as the Saskatoon Public Library's writer-in-residence. He collaborated with Omar Daniel, composer-in-residence at the Royal Conservatory of Music in Toronto, on a piece for piano, string quartet and bass. The composition, You Are Where You Are, is based on text written by Martel, which incorporates parts of cellphone conversations from an ordinary day.ARC Ensemble: Recordings, Concert Excerpts. ARC Ensemble (Artists of The Royal Conservatory) Recordings. Retrieved 14 January 2015.

From 2005 to 2007, Martel was visiting scholar at the University of Saskatchewan.Will, Joanne (Summer 2008). Yann Martel: Life of Yann. Nuvo Magazine. Retrieved 1 April 2016.Beatrice and Virgil, his third novel, came out in 2010. The work is an allegorical take on the Holocaust, attempting to approach the period not through the lens of historical witness, but through imaginative synthesis. The main characters in the story are a writer, a taxidermist, and two stuffed animals: a red howler monkey and a donkey.

From 2007 to 2011, Martel ran a book club with the then Prime Minister of Canada, Stephen Harper, sending the Prime Minister a book every two weeks for four years, a total of more than a hundred novels, plays, poetry collections, graphic novels and children's books.Smith, Joanna (1 February 2011).Yann Martel shuts down Harper book club. The Star online. Retrieved 24 March 2016. The letters were published as a book in 2012, 101 Letters to a Prime Minister.101 Letters to a Prime Minister: Yann Martel opens up his book club. ipolitics.com. Retrieved 24 March 2016. The Polish magazine Histmag cited him as the inspiration behind their giving of ten books to the Prime Minister Donald Tusk, which had been donated by their publishers and selected by readers of the magazine. Tusk reacted very positively.

Martel was invited to be a Fellow of the Royal Society of Literature in 2014. He sat on the Board of Governors of the Saskatoon Public Library from 2010 to 2015.

His fourth novel, The High Mountains of Portugal, was published on 2 February 2016. It tells of three characters in Portugal in three different time periods, who cope with love and loss each in their own way.Zimmerman, Jean (5 February 2016).NPR Book Review: Confronting Loss While Scaling 'The High Mountains Of Portugal'. NPR. Retrieved 25 March 2016. It made The New York Times Bestseller list within the first month of its release.

 Published works 
 Seven Stories (1993)
 The Facts Behind the Helsinki Roccamatios (Collection of four short stories, including the title story) (1993)
 Self (1996)
 Life of Pi (2001)
 We Ate the Children Last (Short story) (2004)
 Beatrice and Virgil (2010)
 101 Letters to a Prime Minister: The Complete Letters to Stephen Harper (2012)
 The first 55 book suggestions are available as What is Stephen Harper Reading? (2009)
 The High Mountains of Portugal (2016)

 Awards and accolades 
 The High Mountains of Portugal 
 New York Times Bestseller 2016

 Beatrice and Virgil 
 New York Times Bestseller 2010
 Boston Globe Bestseller
 L.A. Times Bestseller
 Minneapolis Star Tribune Bestseller
 National No. 1 Bestseller in Maclean's
 No. 1 Bestseller in The Toronto Star Longlisted for The 2012 International Dublin Literary Award
 Financial Times 2010 Fiction of the Year

 Life of Pi 
 Winner of the 2002 Man Booker Prize for FictionLife of Pi Wins 2002 Man Booker Prize for Fiction. American Booksellers Association, Bookselling This Week. Retrieved 25 January 2015.
 New York Times Bestseller List 2002–03 (61 weeks)
 Winner of the Asian/Pacific American Award for Literature 2002
 Winner of the Hugh MacLennan Prize for Fiction 2001
 Winner of The Boeke Prize 2003 (South Africa)
 Winner of the Deutscher Bücherpreis, 2004
 Winner of the La Presse Prix du Grand Public 2003Life Of Pi entry. Les Éditions XYZ Catalogue. Retrieved 1 February 2015.
 Winner in the Scene It Read It category of the Coventry Inspiration Book Awards 2014
 A Quill & Quire Best Book of 2001

 'The Facts behind the Helsinki Roccamatios' (short story) 
 Winner of the 1991 Journey Prize

 Film adaptations 
 Life of Pi, directed by Ang Lee in 2012 and won multiple awards. Martel makes a brief appearance as an extra, sitting on a park bench across a pond while Irrfan Khan (Pi) and Rafe Spall (playing Yann Martel) converse.Medley, Mark (21 November 2012). Life of Pi author Yann Martel: "Overall, I think it's a wonderful companion piece". National Post. Retrieved 26 January 2015.
 His short story We Ate the Children Last was adapted as an independent film by Andrew Cividino.
 Manners of Dying, directed by Jeremy Peter Allen in 2004.
 The Facts behind the Helsinki Roccamatios

 Theatrical adaptations 
 Beatrice and Virgil, adapted by Lindsay Cochrane and directed by Sarah Garton Stanley at the Factory Theatre, Toronto in 2013.
 'The Facts behind the Helsinki Roccamatios'
 Life of Pi, adapted by Lolita Chakrabarti and directed by Max Webster at the Crucible Theatre in Sheffield. This adaptation uses puppets controlled by the cast to represent the animals from the story. It ran from 28 June to 20 July 2019.

 Influences 
Martel has said in a number of interviews that Dante's Divine Comedy is the single most impressive book he has ever read. In talking about his most memorable childhood book, he recalls Le Petit Chose'' by Alphonse Daudet. He said that he read it when he was ten years old, and it was the first time he found a book so heartbreaking that it moved him to tears.

His writing influences include Dante Alighieri, Franz Kafka, Joseph Conrad, Nikolai Gogol, Sinclair Lewis, Moacyr Scliar, Thomas Hardy, Leo Tolstoy, Alphonse Daudet, J.M. Coetzee and Knut Hamsun.

Honours

References

External links 

 
 
 Archives of Yann Martel http://central.bac-lac.gc.ca/.redirect?app=fonandcol&id=3721039&lang=eng [Yann Martel fonds, R15931)] are held at Library and Archives Canada

1963 births
Booker Prize winners
Canadian male short story writers
Fellows of the Royal Society of Literature
Canadian male novelists
Living people
People from Salamanca
Trent University alumni
Writers from Saskatoon
20th-century Canadian novelists
21st-century Canadian novelists
20th-century Canadian short story writers
21st-century Canadian short story writers
20th-century Canadian male writers
21st-century Canadian male writers
Companions of the Order of Canada